Hypotacha glaucata is a species of moth in the family Erebidae. It is found in Ethiopia and Kenya.

References

Moths described in 1897
Hypotacha
Moths of Africa